Piletocera albiventralis is a moth in the family Crambidae. It was described by George Hampson in 1917. It is found in the Solomon Islands, where it has been recorded from Choiseul Island.

References

albiventralis
Moths described in 1917
Taxa named by George Hampson
Moths of Oceania